XIV Cuadrangular Cuna de Futbol Mexicano Banorte or simply known as Copa Pachuca is the 14th edition of the Copa Pachuca.

Teams Participating

Bracket

Matches

Semifinal 1

Semifinal 2

Final

References

External links
tuzos.com.mx
Regresa el cuadrangular de Pachuca en Futbolteca-Historia y Numeros del Futbol

Copa Pachuca
2009–10 in Mexican football